Lycée Albert-Camus is a French senior high school in Bois-Colombes, Hauts-de-Seine, France, in the Paris metropolitan area.

The school has German, Spanish, Italian, and English international sections.

References

External links
 Lycée Albert-Camus 

Lycées in Hauts-de-Seine